Bredesen is a Norwegian surname. Notable people with the surname include:

Espen Bredesen (born 1968), Norwegian ski jumper
Phil Bredesen (born 1943), American politician and businessman
Per Bredesen (1930–2022), Norwegian footballer
Trond-Arne Bredesen (born 1967), Norwegian nordic combined skier

Norwegian-language surnames